Transmat is the record label of techno musician Derrick May, founded in 1986. For years, the label "released the tracks that would fuel the techno boom". Artists included Rhythim Is Rhythim, James Pennington, Joey Beltram, and more.

Transmat includes the sub-label Fragile Records.

Detroit and its story has been told and like all legendary tales, those who have paid attention know more  the average person tuning in.-- DJ Frankie Bones about Rhythim is Rhythim's "Nude Photo"

See also 
 List of record labels
 1986 in music

References

External links 
 Transmat's discography on Discogs

American record labels
Record labels established in 1986
Techno record labels
History of Detroit